The 2015 Canad Inns Women's Classic was held from October 22 to 25 at the Portage Curling Club in Portage la Prairie, Manitoba as part of the World Curling Tour. The event was held in a triple-knockout format with a purse of $60,000.

In the final, 2018 Olympic silver medalist Kim Eun-jung of South Korea defeated 2014 Olympic gold medalist Jennifer Jones team from Manitoba to win the event. Kim took home the $15,400 winners purse while Jones settled for $10,400.

Teams
The teams are listed as follows:

Knockout brackets

Source:

A event

B event

C event

Knockout results
All draw times listed in Central Time (UTC−06:00).

Draw 1
Thursday, October 22, 1:30 pm

Draw 2
Thursday, October 22, 5:00 pm

Draw 3
Thursday, October 22, 8:30 pm

Draw 4
Friday, October 23, 10:00 am

Draw 5
Friday, October 23, 1:30 pm

Draw 6
Friday, October 23, 5:00 pm

Draw 7
Friday, October 23, 8:30 pm

Draw 8
Saturday, October 24, 10:00 am

Draw 9
Saturday, October 24, 1:30 pm

Draw 10
Saturday, October 24, 5:00 pm

Draw 11
Saturday, October 24, 8:30 pm

Playoffs

Source:

Quarterfinals
Sunday, October 25, 10:00 am

Semifinals
Sunday, October 25, 2:00 pm

Final
Sunday, October 25, 6:00 pm

Notes

References

External links
CurlingZone

2015 in Canadian curling
2015 in Manitoba
October 2015 sports events in Canada
2015 in women's curling
Sport in Portage la Prairie